Qubla-Ustyurt is an urban-type settlement of Qo‘ng‘irot District in Karakalpakstan in Uzbekistan.

References

Populated places in Karakalpakstan